This is a list of mayors of the city of Frauenfeld, Switzerland. Since 1946, the term Stadtammann is used to designate the mayor.

References 

Frauenfeld
 
Frauenfeld
Lists of mayors (complete 1900-2013)